The 1971 Astro-Bluebonnet Bowl was a college football bowl game that featured the Colorado Buffaloes and the Houston.

Background
Colorado finished third in the Big Eight Conference.  This their fourth bowl game appearance in five seasons and their first Bluebonnet Bowl since 1967. As for the Cougars, this was their second Astro-Bluebonnet Bowl in three seasons.

Game summary
Robert Newhouse had 35 carries for 168 yards for Houston. Charlie Davis had 202 yards on 37 carries for Colorado.

Scoring summary
 Colorado – Charlie Davis 27-yard touchdown run (Dean kick) – 11:24 remaining in the 1st quarter
 Houston – Robert Newhouse 2-yard touchdown run (Terrell kick) – 5:22 remaining in the 1st quarter
 Houston – Robert Newhouse 5-yard touchdown run (Terrell kick) – 1:14 remaining in the 1st quarter
 Colorado – Larry Brunson 5-pass from Ken Johnson (kick failed) – 13:20 remaining in the 2nd quarter
 Colorado – Dean 32 yard field goal – 5:03 remaining in the 2nd quarter
 Colorado – Charlie Davis 1 yard-touchdown run (Dean kick) – 1:13 remaining in the 2nd quarter
 Houston – Ricky Terrell 29 yard-field goal – 2:16 remaining in the 3rd quarter
 Colorado – Ken Johnson 1-yard touchdown run (pass failed) – 3:48 remaining in the 4th quarter

Aftermath
The Buffaloes finished third in the final AP Poll. They went to three more bowl games in the decade, including an Astro-Bluebonnet Bowl appearance in 1975. The Cougars (who finished 17th in the final poll) returned to the Astro-Bluebonnet Bowl in 1973, en route to four more bowls in the decade.

Statistics

References

Bluebonnet Bowl
Bluebonnet Bowl
Colorado Buffaloes football bowl games
Houston Cougars football bowl games
Astro-Bluebonnet Bowl
Astro-Bluebonnet